is a Japanese tarento, comedian, and actress. She is also an impressionist (monomane tarento).

Shimizu's real name is  She is represented with Jam House. Shimizu graduated from Takayama Nishi High School and Bunkyo University Women's College Division of Home Economics.

Impressions
Shinobu Otake
Yumi Matsutoya
Kaori Momoi
Akiko Yano
Remi Hirano
Ryoko Moriyama
Tetsuko Kuroyanagi
Aya Sugimoto
Yuriko Koike

Filmography

TV variety

Current appearances

Former appearances

TV drama

Films

Animated films

Anime television

Dubbing

Radio

Current appearances

Former appearances

Advertisements

Discography

Albums

Singles

Videography

DVD

Bibliography

Co-authored

Serials

Others

References

Notes

External links
 

Japanese television personalities
Japanese actresses
Japanese impressionists (entertainers)
Japanese radio personalities
People from Gifu Prefecture
1960 births
Living people